The Mayor of Padang is an elected politician who is accountable for the strategic government of Padang, one of the provincial capitals in Indonesia. The position was first held by W.M. Ouwerkerk whe  the role was created in 1928 by the Dutch colonial government, while under government of Indonesia it was first held by Abubakar Jaar in 1945, after Indonesian independence.

Mayors of Indonesian provinces are now chosen via popular election. Mahyeldi Ansharullah has held the position since 2014 until 2019 after being elected in the 2013 election.

Below is a list of Mayors of Padang, who had been held the position since under Government of Indonesia in 1945.

References 
 Footnotes

 Bibliography

 
 
 
 
 
 
 
 
 
 

Padang

Mayors of Padang
Mayors of places in Indonesia